L'Afrique en morceaux  is a 2000 documentary film directed by Jihan El-Tahri.

Synopsis 
April, 1994. Genocide in Rwanda. 800,000 dead. A catastrophe that upset the balance in the entire region. The Great Lakes region of Africa ended the year with a bloodbath. This documentary shows the intrigues, the dramatic effects, the treasons, the vengeances that prevailed over those years and whose only goal was to maintain or increase each faction's area of influence. In just ten years, the population saw all their hopes vanish: The dream of an Africa in control of its own destiny, alimentary self-sufficiency, the end of interethnic conflicts.

References 

2000 films
2000 documentary films
French documentary films
Documentary films about the Rwandan genocide
2000s French films